Mamouna is the ninth solo album by Bryan Ferry, released on Virgin Records first on 31 August 1994 in Japan and then on 5 September in the UK. It was Ferry's first album of original material in seven years and he spent six years writing and recording it, under the working title Horoscope. The album peaked at number 11 on the UK Albums Chart.

The album features contributions from former members of Ferry's band Roxy Music, including Brian Eno who left the band in 1973.

Critical reception
Reviewing for AllMusic, critic Ned Raggett wrote of the album: “There are some songs of note — ‘The 39 Steps’ has a slightly menacing vibe to it, appropriate given the cinematic reference of the title, while the Ferry/Eno collaboration ‘Wildcat Days’ displays some of Eno’s old synth-melting flash. Overall, though, Mamouna is pleasant without being involving.”

Track listing
All tracks composed by Bryan Ferry, except where noted.

"Don't Want To Know" – 4:07
"N.Y.C." – 4:10
"Your Painted Smile" – 3:14
"Mamouna" – 5:11
"The Only Face" – 4:40
"The 39 Steps" – 5:01
"Which Way To Turn" – 5:44
"Wildcat Days" (Ferry, Brian Eno) – 4:34
"Gemini Moon" – 3:47
"Chain Reaction" – 5:08
"In Every Dream Home a Heartache" (Live) – 7:34 [Japan only bonus track]
"Bête Noire" (Ferry, Patrick Leonard) (Live) – 4:05 [Japan only bonus track]

Personnel 
 Bryan Ferry – lead vocals, acoustic piano (1-8, 10), Oberheim synthesizer (1), various synth sounds (2, 5, 6, 8), synth oboe (3, 9, 10), synth sax (4), Mellotron (4), vocoder (5), Roland Juno-106 (6), Prophet-5 (6), Roland Jupiter-8 (7), strings (9, 10)
 Brian Eno – various sonics (1, 4-7, 9, 10), sweep treatments (8)
 Richard T. Norris – programming (2, 3, 5, 9, 10), loops (8)
 Rhett Davies – programming (7)
 Guy Fletcher – synthesizers (10)
 Neil Hubbard – rhythm guitar (1), guitar licks (2, 4, 6, 7), lead guitar (3, 5, 10), guitar (9)
 Chester Kamen – guitar (1, 3, 4, 7-10), Latin guitar (5), gondola (6), guitar scratches (8)
 Phil Manzanera – guitar (1, 7)
 Jeff Thall – guitar (1-4, 6, 8, 10)
 David Williams – guitar riff (1, 4, 6, 7, 8), backing vocals (2), rhythm guitar (3, 9, 10)
 Nile Rodgers – rhythm guitar (2, 6, 9)
 Robin Trower – guitar (6)
 Neil Jason – Bass (9)
 Nathan East – bass (1, 2, 3, 5-10)
 Pino Palladino – bass (4)
 Guy Pratt – Wah bass (5, 6, 9)
 Steve Ferrone – drums
 Luke Cresswell – percussion (2)
 Luís Jardim – percussion (3)
 Steve Scales – percussion (9)
 Maceo Parker – alto saxophone (2)
 Mike Paice – alto saxophone (7)
 Andy Mackay – alto saxophone (8, 9)
 Carleen Anderson – backing vocals
 Jhelisa Anderson – backing vocals (1, 9, 10)
 Fonzi Thornton – backing vocals (2, 9)
 Yanick Etienne – backing vocals (5, 6)
 Paul Johnson –  backing vocals (6)
 Nan Kidwell – astrologer (9)

Production 
 Bryan Ferry – producer, art direction
 Robin Trower – producer 
 Johnson Somerset – assistant producer
 Sven Taits – engineer
 Richard T. Norris – additional engineer
 Simon Puxley – engineer consultant 
 Bob Clearmountain – mixing
 Bob Ludwig – mastering
 Nick de Ville – art direction, design 
 James Ward – painting
 Steven Cassidy – photography
 Andy Gershon – management 
 David Enthoven – management
 Juliet Mann – management
 I. E. Management (London) – management company 
 Cohen Brothers Management (Los Angeles) – management company

Studios
 Recorded at  Utopia Studios, Master Rock Studios and Studio One (London, UK).
 Mixed at MixThis! (Los Angeles, California, USA).
 Mastered at Gateway Mastering (Portland, Maine, USA).

Charts
Album

References

1994 albums
Bryan Ferry albums
Capitol Records albums